Croxteth is a suburb of Liverpool, Merseyside, England, and a Liverpool City Council Ward. Although housing in the area is predominantly modern, the suburb has some notable history. At the United Kingdom 2011 Census it had a population of 14,561.

History
The name is believed to derive from a contraction of Crocker's Staithe, or the landing place of Crocker, which is a likely reference to a Viking landing via the River Alt, which passes through Croxteth and at the time of the Viking invasion of Britain was navigable through the area. The similar root is also possible for Toxteth.

Prehistoric tools were found on a site in Croxteth in 1992, though there were no signs of any permanent settlement. Since then the land has been developed.

The suburb is adjacent to Croxteth Hall, the former home of the Earls of Sefton, and close to West Derby, another suburb that predates Liverpool, being recorded in the Domesday Book. The "Dog and Gun" public house (demolished in 2005) was a historic hostelry, likely associated with the hunt from Croxteth Hall.

The first tranche of housing in Croxteth was built to rehouse families from the Scotland Road area of the city that was subject to mass demolition during the construction of the second Mersey Tunnel. Within the past twenty years very large areas of Croxteth Park and a City Council playing field have been sold for housing development to create a huge housing estate, noted for its lack of local 

From the A580 road (the Liverpool-East Lancashire Road, abbreviated to and known commonly as East Lancs Road) passing Malpas Road to St. Swithens including the much talked about haunting of Gillmoss School. Croxteth was one of the first "suburbs of Liverpool". Croxteth Park, a development area, came many years later.

The first houses in the Croxteth estate were in fact built in the immediate post war period to house skilled workers from Slough and Rugby who had been brought in to the English Electric and Napier factories on the East Lancs Road), and families from the dockland inner-city areas who had lost their homes through bombing and slum demolition. The second tunnel came much later. The first families arrived in 1951 to live in an estate that was without roads, pavements, shops, pubs or buses. However, in the wake of World War II during the late 1940s and early 1950s, massive residential extensions at Croxteth, alongside similar and indistinguishable development of neighbouring Norris Green, resulted in what together, are now regarded as the largest municipal housing estate in Europe.

Transport
The main road network is the A580 East Lancashire Road which is the United Kingdom's first purpose-built inter-city highway. This is to the north of Croxteth at nearby Gillmoss and links the area to Walton in Liverpool to the junction of the A6 at Irlams o' th' Height in Salford. The A580 also provides links to the M6 Motorway near Haydock in St Helens approximately 11 miles away.

The M57 motorway is much nearer to Croxteth, 1-2 miles away on the Gilmmos/Kirkby border and this provides connections to the M62 motorway and eventually becomes A5300 Knowsley Expressway at Tarbock Interchange providing links to the A562 to Widnes and Runcorn and A561 Speke Boulevard to the south of Liverpool.

The Croxteth estate was generally built around Storrington Avenue, Altcross Road and Middle Way.

The 14/14A is the main high frequency bus route serving the Croxteth estate and this has operated (with variants) for many decades. 14's link Croxteth to Liverpool City Centre via Norris Green and it's Broadway shopping parade, Clubmoor and the south of Anfield via the Utting Avenue East/Towsnend Lane/Breck Road bus corridor. The 14A (and other variants) continue from Croxteth to Kirkby and these services are shared between Arriva Merseyside and Stagecoach Merseyside & South Lancashire and are part of a Quality Bus Partnership with Merseytravel. Other routes serving the Croxteth Estate include the 102 (Page Moss/Broadgreen Hospital - Fazakerley Hospital), 214/215 (Walton Park circulars) and 898/899 (Page Moss - Knowsley Industrial Estate). These services are provided by Arriva Merseyside, Cumfybus and HTL Buses along with other industrial and school services which pass through Croxteth some of which are subsidised by Merseytravel. Stagecoach 19/19A (Kirkby - Liverpool City Centre) could also be included as serving the north of Croxteth (Gillmoss, Stonedale) via the East Lancashire Road.

The nearest National Rail station is approximately three miles away in Fazakerley on the Kirkby branch of the Northern Line, Merseyrail network.

A proposed light rail system, Merseytram was intended to serve Croxteth. Approved in 2002 Line One would have linked Kirkby and Croxteth to Liverpool City Centre via West Derby, West Derby Road, the Royal Liverpool University Hospital and a city centre loop. The Merseytram Line 1 Transport and Works Act was approved by the then Secretary of State for Transport Alistair Darling in December 2004 and construction of the route was expected to begin with the M-Pact consortium of GrantRail and Laing O’Rourke selected to do so from 2005. However due to cost overruns and other associated difficulties with the Merseytram project the scheme was cancelled in November 2009. It remains to be seen whether these plans will be revived in future.

Education
The area is serviced by two secondary schools (11-18); Dixons Croxteth Academy (mixed) and St John Bosco Arts College (Catholic Girls). In 2010, a third school, Croxteth Community Comprehensive (Mixed), closed due to poor academic standards and falling pupils numbers, despite local protests and the school achieving higher academic standards in OFSTED reports and on average higher student grades than De La Salle. In June 2008 it was revealed a new £20m "super-school" would be built on the site of De La Salle. However, this proposal has since been scrapped.

Notable residents
Former England footballer Wayne Rooney and his wife Coleen (nee McLoughlin) grew up and met in the area. Coleen was a pupil at St John Bosco School and Wayne attended De La Salle School (now Dixons Croxteth Academy).

One-time England footballer Francis Jeffers also attended De La Salle School.

Distance runner Robert Pope, who became the first person to complete the 15,600-mile Forrest Gump run, was born and raised in the area.

References

External links

 Liverpool City Council, Ward Profile: Croxteth
 Local Information: Croxteth Park
 Liverpool Street Gallery - Liverpool 11
 Liverpool Street Gallery - Liverpool 12
 Croxteth Country Park Residents Association

Areas of Liverpool